Allium tuolumnense is a rare species of wild onion, known by the common name Rawhide Hill onion.

It is endemic to Tuolumne County, California, where it is known only from a small section of the Sierra Nevada foothills at Rawhide Hill and the Red Hills. It is a plant of serpentine soils.

Description

The stem is topped with a hemispheric inflorescence holding 20 to 60 flowers, each on a pedicel one or two centimeters long. Each flower is just under a centimeter wide when fully open, with six white or pink oval-shaped tepals. There are six stamens and the ovary has six pointed crests.

See also
Serpentine soils
Red Hills (Tuolumne County)

References

External links
 
Jepson Manual Treatment — Allium tuolumnense
USDA Plants Profile
Flora of North America
Allium tuolumnense — U.C. Photo gallery

tuolumnense
Endemic flora of California
Flora of the Sierra Nevada (United States)
Natural history of Tuolumne County, California
Onions